Haiku d'Etat is the debut studio album by American hip hop group Haiku d'Etat. It was released in 1999. In 2004, it was re-released with a different cover and a different track listing.

Critical reception

Stanton Swihart of AllMusic gave the album 4.5 out of 5 stars, saying: "The musical backdrop actually maintains the same high standard as the rhyming, something that had occasionally plagued past efforts from the Project Blowed crew." He called it "one of those albums destined to go undeservedly neglected but deservedly revered." Nathan Rabin of The A.V. Club said: "Haiku D'Etat gets better with each listen, with every spin yielding a greater appreciation of the three MCs' chemistry and the surprising layers of subtlety and sophistication lurking beneath the deceptively simple production." Orlando Weekly called it "one of the most amazing hip-hop albums of the decade."

The album was placed at number 22 on Robert Christgau's "Pazz & Jop 2001: Dean's List".

Track listing

References

Further reading

External links
 

1999 debut albums
Haiku D'Etat albums
Decon albums